The Waterford county football team represents Waterford in men's Gaelic football and is governed by Waterford GAA, the county board of the Gaelic Athletic Association. The team competes in the three major annual inter-county competitions; the All-Ireland Senior Football Championship, the Munster Senior Football Championship and the National Football League.

Waterford's home ground is Fraher Field, Dungarvan and Walsh Park, Waterford. The team's manager is Ephie Fitzgerald.

The team last won the Munster Senior Championship in 1898, but has never won the All-Ireland Senior Championship or the National League.

History
The team's greatest achievement is reaching the 1898 All-Ireland Senior Football Championship Final, a game which was lost to Dublin by a scoreline of 2–08 to 0–04. Erin's Hope of Dungarvan represented the county in that game.

In recent times, the team have twice won the All-Ireland Junior Football Championship (JFC).

In 2003, Waterford unexpectedly won a Munster Under-21 Football Championship, defeating Kerry in the final.

Waterford has not reached a Munster Senior Football Championship (SFC) final since 1960, has not defeated Kerry since 1957, Cork since 1960, Limerick since 1981 and Tipperary since 1988. On 20 May 2007, the team broke a 19-year run without a senior championship win by defeating Clare at Fraher Field, Dungarvan, by a scoreline of 1–06 to 0–07. Manager John Kiely's starting team consisted of: Tom Wall; Justin Walsh, Thomas O'Gorman, Shane Briggs; John Phelan, Edmond Rockett, Paul Ogle; Mick Ahern, John Hurney; Brian Wall, Gary Hurney, Ger Power; Wayne Hennessy, Andy Hubbord and Liam O'Lonain.

The team defeated Clare again in 2010.

League promotion
In 2010, after going so close to promotion in previous years Waterford went unbeaten in the league (defeating Leitrim, London, Kilkenny, Limerick, Clare and Wicklow and securing draws against Longford and Carlow), but fell short in the final against Limerick at Croke Park.

Current panel

(c)

INJ Player has had an injury which has affected recent involvement with the county team.
RET Player has since retired from the county team.
WD Player has since withdrawn from the county team due to a non-injury issue.

Current management team
Manager: Ephie Fitzgerald, appointed on a two-year term in October 2021
Selectors:

Managerial history
This is a list of people who have managed the Waterford county football team.

Players

Notable players

Records
Goalkeeper Darren Mulhearne made his championship debut at the age of 46 in 2019.

All Stars
Waterford has no All Stars.

Honours

National
All-Ireland Senior Football Championship
 Runners-up (1): 1898
All-Ireland Junior Football Championship
 Winners (2): 1999, 2004
National Football League
None
All-Ireland Under-21 Football Championship
None
All-Ireland Minor Football Championship
None

Provincial
Munster Senior Football Championship
 Winners (1): 1898
 Runners-up (9): 1891, 1896, 1904, 1908, 1911, 1940, 1946, 1957, 1960
Munster Junior Football Championship
 Winners (3): 1948, 1999, 2004
Munster Under-21 Football Championship
 Winners (1): 2003
Munster Minor Football Championship
None
McGrath Cup
 Winners (2): 1981, 2015

References

 
County football teams